Marcin Piekarski may refer to:
 Marcin Piekarski (luger) (born 1983), Polish luger
 Marcin Piekarski (speedway rider) (born 1989), Polish motorcycle speedway rider in 2007 Speedway Ekstraliga